Intra may refer to:
 Intra (album),  a 2005 album by metal band Ram-Zet
 Intra, a city now part of Verbania, Italy
 Intra Airways, British airline
 Intra (software), anti Internet censorship Android app by Google.
 Intra-frame coding, a video compression technique that utilizes I-frames, a video compression picture type
 Intra Bank, Lebanese bank
 Intra (Teka), Norwegian company
 Groupe INTRA, French emergency response organization
 AVC-Intra, a type of video coding

People with the surname 
Enrico Intra (born 1935), Italian pianist, composer, and conductor
Giovanni Intra (1968–2002), New Zealand artist, writer, and art dealer

See also